CRKSV Jong Colombia is a football club in Curaçao, playing in the country's first division Curaçao League. Located in Boka Sami Municipality Sint Michiel It was founded on 23 July 1951. Its name and its crest is a reference to Colombia, located 1045.8 km from the island.

Overview
The side topped the league in 1998, 2000 and 2001 as well as finishing second in the 2005–06 season behind CSD Barber. The club is based in the town of Boca Sami. They have an old rivalry with CRKSV Jong Holland based in the capital of Curaçao; Willemstad. They play in Maroon and Yellow. Former players include; Rocky Siberie who currently plays in Italy for fourth division side ASD Pro Settimo & Eureka and Netherlands Antilles national football team, Nuelson Wau who also plays for the national team but plies his trade in the Netherlands for Willem II of the first division. The club also produced one of the countries most prolific goalscorers in powerhouse Brutil Hosé who played for Sarawak FA in Malaysia.

Old Generation 1979
The CRKSV Jong Colombia has participated 10 times in CONCACAF Champions League (1968, 1969, 1973, 1974, 1976, 1979, 1980, 1989, 1992 and 1994), reaching the final of the latter in 1967 and 1979. According to the majority opinion of the Antilles, the golden generation of CRKSV Jong Colombia was the 1979 as the team then gave a good show of football in every game his style of play was a game of great speed and agility touch .

 Carlos Bernardina (GK)
 Wilbert Zimmerman (DF)
 Elsio Constancia (DF)
 Rudolf Zimmerman (DF)
 Huber Martina (DF)
 Alberto Humbler (MF)
 Héctor Zimmerman (MF)
 Julio Constancia (MF)
 Guillermo Zimmerman (MF)
 Edwin Bernardina (FW)
 Frank Victoria (FW)

In CONCACAF Champions League 1979
First Round

|}

Second Round

|}

Third Round

|}

Fourth Round

|}

Final

|}

Achievements
Netherlands Antilles Championship: 12
1966, 1968, 1971, 1972, 1973, 1974, 1975, 1978, 1988, 1994, 1997, 2001

Curaçao League: 12
1963, 1965, 1966, 1967, 1969, 1972, 1973, 1975, 1978, 1988, 1994, 2000

Performance in CONCACAF competitions
CFU Club Championship: 4 appearances
CFU Club Championship 2001 – Second Round – group stage (Caribbean Zone) hosted by  Racing Club Haïtien
CFU Club Championship 2004 – Second Round – Lost to  Arnett Gardens 13 – 1 on aggregate
CFU Club Championship 2005 – Quarter-Finals – Lost to  Portmore United FC 10 – 0 on aggregate
CFU Club Championship 2007 – First Round – group stage (Caribbean Zone) hosted by Pointe-à-Pierre in Trinidad and Tobago

CONCACAF Champions' Cup: 10 appearances
CONCACAF Champions' Cup 1967 – 2nd Place – Lost to  CD Águila 5 – 3 on aggregate.
CONCACAF Champions' Cup 1969 – First Round – Lost to  Alianza FC 5 – 3 on aggregate.
CONCACAF Champions' Cup 1973 – Third Round – (Caribbean Zone) – Lost to  SV Transvaal 4 – 2 on aggregate.
CONCACAF Champions' Cup 1974 – Second Round – (Caribbean Zone) – Lost to  SV Transvaal 5 – 3 on aggregate.
CONCACAF Champions' Cup 1976 – First Round – (Caribbean Zone) – Lost to  SV Robinhood 4 – 2 on aggregate.
CONCACAF Champions' Cup 1979 – 2nd Place – Lost to  CD FAS 8 – 2 on aggregate.
CONCACAF Champions' Cup 1980 – Second Round – (Caribbean Zone) – Lost to  SV Transvaal 5 – 0 on aggregate.
CONCACAF Champions' Cup 1989 – First Round Group stage – hosted by  FC Pinar del Río in Cuba
CONCACAF Champions' Cup 1992 – First Round – (Caribbean Zone) – Lost to  Mayaro United 4 – 2 on aggregate.
CONCACAF Champions' Cup 1994 – Fourth Round – (Caribbean Zone) – Lost to  US Robert 3 – 2 on aggregate.

In CONCACAF Champions League 1967

Caribbean Zone Qualifying

Group Stage

All matches played in Kingston, Jamaica.
CRKSV Jong Colombia wins group stage, advances to the Final.
CONCACAF Final

International friendly match
22 April 1969 – CRKSV Jong Colombia 2 – 2  CS Emelec

Current squad 2013–14

Notable former players
 Shanon Carmelia
 Brutil Hosé
 Rocky Siberie
 Nuelson Wau

References

Jong Colombia, CRKSV
Jong Colombia, CRKSV
Association football clubs established in 1951
1951 establishments in Curaçao